Charles Favre (23 January 1961 – 14 May 2015) was a Swiss sailor. He competed at the 1984 Summer Olympics and the 1992 Summer Olympics.

References

External links
 

1961 births
2015 deaths
Swiss male sailors (sport)
Olympic sailors of Switzerland
Sailors at the 1984 Summer Olympics – 470
Sailors at the 1992 Summer Olympics – Tornado
Place of birth missing
20th-century Swiss people